The 1897–1898 Costa Rican general election was held on 12 December of that year under very questionable conditions. Consecutive re-election was forbidden by the Constitution however incumbent president Rafael Yglesias Castro forced a constitutional amendment allowing it to let himself became candidate.  He was also the only candidate on that election. Yglesia's main opposition the Republican Party called for abstention.

References

Elections in Costa Rica
1898 elections in Central America
Single-candidate elections
1898 in Costa Rica
1897 in Costa Rica
1897 elections in Central America